Francis Edward Hyland (October 9, 1901 – January 31, 1968) was an American prelate of the Roman Catholic Church. He served as bishop of what was then the Diocese of Atlanta in Georgia from 1956 to 1961. He previously served as an auxiliary bishop of the Diocese of Savannah-Atlanta from 1949 to 1956.

Biography

Early life 
Francis Hyland was born on October 9, 1901, in Philadelphia, Pennsylvania, to James and Sarah (née McCarron) Hyland. He attended Roman Catholic High School for Boys in Philadelphia and then St. Charles Borromeo Seminary in Wynnewood, Pennsylvania.

Hyland was ordained to the priesthood for the Archdiocese of Philadelphia by Bishop Michael Crane on June 11, 1927. He earned a doctorate in canon law from the Catholic University of America in Washington, D.C., in 1928, then spent ten years as secretary to the Apostolic Delegation in Washington, Returning to Pennsylvania, Hyland served as pastor of the Church of Resurrection Parish in Chester and of Our Lady of Lourdes Parish in Philadelphia (1941–1949).

Auxiliary Bishop of Savannah-Atlanta 
On October 15, 1949, Hyland was appointed auxiliary bishop of the Diocese of Savannah-Atlanta and Titular Bishop of Gomphi by Pope Pius XII. He received his episcopal consecration on December 21, 1949, from Cardinal Dennis Dougherty, with Bishops Hugh L. Lamb and J. Carroll McCormick serving as co-consecrators, at the Cathedral-Basilica of Sts. Peter and Paul in Philadelphia. Hyland selected as his episcopal motto: "Ad Jesum Per Mariam" (Latin: "To Jesus through Mary").

Bishop of Atlanta 
Hyland was named the first bishop of the recently erected Diocese of Atlanta by Pius XII on July 17, 1956. He was installed at the Cathedral of Christ the King in Atlanta on November 8, 1956. After a five-year-long tenure, he resigned as bishop of Atlanta due to ill health on October 11, 1961; upon accepting his resignation, Pope John XXIII appointed him Titular Bishop of Bisica. 

Francis Hyland died in Philadelphia on January 31, 1968 at age 66.

References

1901 births
1968 deaths
St. Charles Borromeo Seminary alumni
Catholic University of America alumni
Clergy from Philadelphia
Roman Catholic bishops of Atlanta
20th-century Roman Catholic bishops in the United States